Ernesto Starita (born 3 March 1996) is an Italian football player who plays as a forward for  club Monopoli.

Career
He made his professional debut in the Lega Pro for Pisa on 6 September 2015 in a game against Prato.

In July 2017 Starita joined Cesena, with Carlo Crialese moved to opposite direction. Starita was immediately left for Pro Piacenza. He made his club debut on 16 July, a friendly match.

On 3 July 2019, he moved to Casertana.

On 27 August 2020 he moved to Monopoli.

References

External links
 

1996 births
Living people
Footballers from Naples
Italian footballers
Association football forwards
Serie B players
Serie C players
Calcio Padova players
F.C. Pro Vercelli 1892 players
Pisa S.C. players
S.S. Fidelis Andria 1928 players
A.C. Cesena players
A.S. Pro Piacenza 1919 players
A.S. Bisceglie Calcio 1913 players
Casertana F.C. players
S.S. Monopoli 1966 players